Deborah Toniolo (born 24 April 1977) is an Italian long-distance runner who specializes in the marathon. She won two medals, with national marathon team, at the International athletics competitions.

Biography
She finished seventh at the 2006 European Athletics Championships in Gothenburg with a personal best time of 2:31:31 hours. She has 5 caps in national team from 2005 to 2007.

See also
2006 European Marathon Cup
2010 European Marathon Cup

References

External links
 

1977 births
Living people
Italian female long-distance runners
Italian female marathon runners
World Athletics Championships athletes for Italy
People from Schio
20th-century Italian women
21st-century Italian women